Emrah Safa Gürkan (born 16 January 1981) is a Turkish historian, professor of Ottoman studies and academic.

Academic career 
Having received his B.A. in International Affairs at Bilkent University (2003), Gürkan wrote his M.A. thesis titled Ottoman Corsairs in the Western Mediterranean and Their Place in the Ottoman-Habsburg Rivalry, 1505-1535 with Halil Inalcık (2006). He then moved to Georgetown University where he completed his Ph.D. with a dissertation on early modern espionage (Espionage in the 16th Century Mediterranean: Secret Diplomacy, Mediterranean Go-Betweens and the Ottoman-Habsburg Rivalry, 2012).

Gürkan studies the early modern Mediterranean with a focus on espionage, piracy, slavery, religious conversion, naval technology and the relationship between the Ottoman Empire and the West. He has written a number of articles in English, Turkish, Italian, Spanish and German as well as two scientific monographs, the first of which received Scientific Monograph of the Year Award from the Turkish Academy of Sciences (TÜBA). Gürkan also receivedthe Outstanding Young Scientist Award from the same institution and Promising Scientist Award at the 14th Kadir Has Awards.

Gürkan has worked as a historical consultant to the TV series Fatih and Rise of Empires: Ottoman. In 2011,with Chris Gratien, he founded the Ottoman History Podcast, a website that has more than 400 interviews in four languages with leading academics.

Awards 
 Turkish Academy of Sciences, Outstanding Young Scientist Award (2018)
 14th  Kadir Has Awards, Promising Scientist Award (2018)
 Turkish Academy of Sciences, Scientific Monograph of the Year (2018) – Sultanın Casusları

Selected works 
 Ezbere Yaşayanlar: Vazgeçemediğimiz Alışkanlıkların Kökenleri (Parrot-fashion Lives: Origins of our Compelling Habits, İstanbul: Kronik, 2022)
 Bunu Herkes Bilir: Tarihteki Yanlış Sorulara Doğru Cevaplar (Everybody Knows It: Right Answers to Wrong Questions in History, İstanbul: Kronik, 2020) 
 Sultanın Korsanları: Osmanlı Akdenizi’nde Gazâ, Yağma ve Esaret, 1500 – 1700 (Pirates of the Sultan: Holy War, Booty and Slavery in the Ottoman Mediterranean, 1500 – 1700, İstanbul: Kronik, 2018) 
 Sultanın Casusları: 16. Yüzyılda İstihbarat, Sabotaj ve Rüşvet Ağları (Spies of the Sultan: Intelligence, Sabotage and Bribery in the 16th century, İstanbul: Kronik, 2017)
 Osmanlı İstanbulu: Uluslararası Osmanlı İstanbulu Sempozyumu Bildirileri (Istanbul: İstanbul 29 Mayıs University Publishing, 2014–2018), 5 vol., with Feridun Emecen and Ali Akyıldız.

References

External links 
 Academia.edu profile

21st-century Turkish historians
1981 births
Living people
Georgetown University Graduate School of Arts and Sciences alumni
Bilkent University alumni
Members of the Turkish Academy of Sciences